Collaborative Arts Project 21, known more commonly as CAP21, is a New York City professional musical theatre training conservatory and Off-Broadway theatre company. It has a core faculty with many associate faculty who are also working professionals.  The conservatory has produced many Broadway performers, as well as actors in off-Broadway, regional, and international theatre, television, film, and other performance media. Until 2012, it was in partnership with the New York University’s Tisch School of the Arts. In 2014, CAP21 joined forces with Molloy University.

History
As a producing organization, CAP21 began in 1994. Its productions take place at CAP21 or at venues in New York City and around the United States. Each season, three new works are produced for a two-week “work in progress” run. In addition CAP21 works in development with twenty new musicals and plays providing public and in-house readings. CAP21’s season features diverse productions of new and classic plays and musicals, drawing audiences from the greater New York metropolitan area.  Nearly 200 theatre artists are engaged each year to create and present new and classic work. 

In 2012 the CAP21 Theatre Company won a GLAAD award for Outstanding New York Theatre: Off and Off-Off Broadway, for its production of the new musical Southern Comfort. The production starred Jeffrey Kuhn and Natalie Joy Johnson. Some faculty include: Lori Leshner, Lawrence Arancio, Sean Dougherty, Jillian Carucci, and Chris O'Connor the Chair of the program (https://www.molloy.edu/academics/undergraduate-programs/molloy-cap21-theatre-arts-program/faculty-profiles).

Alumni
Well-known performers who have been part of the CAP21 theatre group include Lady Gaga, Maddy Apple, Alex Brightman, Adam Jacobs, Javier Muñoz, Jason Tam, Ali Stroker, Matthew Morrison, Kristen Bell and Sosie Bacon.

References

External links
Official CAP21 Website
Official Molloy College Website
Backstage Article September 2010
BroadwayWorld Article October 2013
New York Times Sweat and Sequins
Molloy College Opens New Manhattan Center May 2018
On Stage Blog Top 30 College Musical Theatre Programs 2019-2020
Musical theatre organizations
Off-Broadway theaters
Arts organizations established in 1994
1994 establishments in New York City
Performing arts education in New York (state)